Micraeschus is a genus of moths of the family Erebidae first described by Arthur Gardiner Butler in 1878.

Description
Palpi very slender and obliquely upturned, reaching vertex of head. Antennae with fasciculated cilia in male. Thorax and abdomen tuftless. Legs naked, with normal spurs. Forewing with veins 7 to 10 stalked. Hindwings with stalked 3 and 4. Larva with two pairs of abdominal prolegs.

Species
 Micraeschus elataria Walker, 1861
 Micraeschus rufipallens Warren, 1913

References

 
 

Boletobiinae
Noctuoidea genera